Donald Francis Ross (born October 11, 1942) is an American former ice hockey player.

Early life 
Ross was born in Roseau, Minnesota. He was a member of the North Dakota Fighting Hawks men's ice hockey team from 1961 to 1965.

Career 
Ross played at the 1964 Winter Olympics and 1968 Winter Olympics for the United States National Team in the ice hockey tournament, finishing fifth. He is a member of the University of North Dakota Letterwinners Association Hall of Fame.

Awards and honors

References

External links

1942 births
Living people
American men's ice hockey defensemen
North Dakota Fighting Hawks ice hockey
Ice hockey players at the 1964 Winter Olympics
Ice hockey players at the 1968 Winter Olympics
Olympic ice hockey players of the United States
NCAA men's ice hockey national champions
AHCA Division I men's ice hockey All-Americans

People from Roseau, Minnesota
People from Roseau County, Minnesota